Sotirios Alex Manolopoulos (born June 27, 1970) is a Greek retired professional basketball player and current basketball head coach, who is the head coach of Romanian side Dinamo București. Born in Athens, he played college basketball at Boston University. After graduating, he returned to his native Greece, to play professional basketball. He had served as an assistant coach in several teams in the Greek Basket League, before he was appointed the head coach of Panathinaikos in May 2015.

Playing career

College career
Manolopoulos played college basketball at Boston University, with the Boston University Terriers. He was twice named to the America East Academic Honor Roll (1992, 1993). He appeared in 58 games for the Terriers, from 1989 to 1993, averaging 3.6 points, 1.1 rebounds, and 0.7 steals per game.

Professional career
Manolopoulos played professionally with Papagou, Maroussi, and Doukas. While playing with Maroussi, he won the FIBA Saporta Cup 2000–01 season championship.

Coaching career
Manolopoulos started his coaching career as an assistant coach with Peristeri, in 2004. In the 2005–06 season, he was appointed the assistant coach of Makedonikos. He moved to Maroussi for the next season, with whom he stayed until 2011. He was named Aris' assistant coach in 2011. He was given the assistant coach job of Panathinaikos, in 2012. On May 4, 2015 he was appointed as Panathinaikos' head coach, after the removal of Duško Ivanović from the position.

On 22 October 2015, he was appointed as an assistant coach for AEK Athens. On 18 December 2015, he was appointed as the head coach of AEK Athens, after the removal of Dragan Šakota from that same position, so that he could become the general manager of the team. On March 21, 2017, after the departure of head coach Jure Zdovc from the club, Manolopoulos became the new head coach of the club, after signing a contract with them, through the year 2018.

Honors and titles

Playing career
FIBA Saporta Cup Champion:
2001

References

External links
FIBA Archive Player Profile
FIBA Europe Player Profile

1970 births
Living people
Boston University Terriers men's basketball players
AEK B.C. coaches
Doukas B.C. players
Greek basketball coaches
Greek expatriate basketball people in the United States
Greek men's basketball players
Ifaistos Limnou B.C. coaches
Maroussi B.C. players
Panathinaikos B.C. coaches
Papagou B.C. players
Point guards
Shooting guards
Basketball players from Athens